Konrad Seppelt (born September 2, 1944 in Leipzig) is a academic author, professor and former vice president of the Free University Berlin.

Publications

Popular publications
 Cutting Edge, Konrad Seppelt, The (London) Times Higher Education Supplement, November 10, 2000, p. 24.
 The Future of Chemistry ... , Editorial, Angew. Chem. Int. Ed. 2004, 43, 3618 –3620
 Science, Isolation and structural and electronic characterization of salts of the decamethylferrocene dication. August 2016 12;353(6300):678-82
 Science, Xenon as a complex ligand: the tetra xenono Gold(II) cation in AuXe42+(Sb2F11−)2.  2000 Oct 6;290(5489):117-8.
 Science, Response: Structure of W(CH3)6. 1996 Apr 12;272(5259):182b-3b.

Scientific publications
A random selection of Prof Seppelt's publications:

Seppelt, K. “Selenoyl difluoride” Inorganic Syntheses, 1980, volume XX, pp. 36–38. .

Seppelt, K., Pfennig, V. Science 1996, 271, 626-8.
Kleinhenz, S., Pfennig, V., Seppelt, K. Chem. Eur. J. 1998, 4, 1687-91.

Seppelt, K. Accounts of Chemical Research 2003, 36(2), 147-153.

References

External links
 CV
 Prof Seppelt's research group

1944 births
Living people
Inorganic chemists
Academic staff of the Free University of Berlin